Hymenostegia bakeriana is a species of plant in the family Fabaceae. It is found in Cameroon and Nigeria. It is threatened by habitat loss.

Taxonomy
The Latin specific epithet bakeriana is in honor of the English botanist John Gilbert Baker.

References

Detarioideae
Flora of Cameroon
Flora of Nigeria
Vulnerable plants
Taxonomy articles created by Polbot